Ehlert is a German surname.  Notable people with the surname include:

Herta Ehlert (1905–1997), female guard at many Nazi concentration camps during the Holocaust
Lois Ehlert (1934–2021), American author and illustrator of children's books
Louis Ehlert (1825–1884), German composer and music critic
Mavis Ehlert (1922–2007), British, Canadian sculptor
Tamara Ehlert (1921–2008), German writer and lyricist

See also 
Michael Ehlert Falch (born 1956), Danish singer, guitarist, author and actor

References

German-language surnames